The 2012 Giro d'Italia began on 5 May, and stage 11 occurred on 16 May. The 2012 edition began with an individual time trial stage – where each member of the starting peloton of 198 riders competed against the clock – in Herning, Denmark with two more stages held in the country before an early rest day. The riders then travelled by air to Italy, with the race resuming in Verona and a team time trial, an event where each member of a team started together racing against the clock.

Taylor Phinney held the lead of the race throughout its opening Danish leg; having won the race-commencing individual time trial, Phinney defended it on the following two stages, despite crashing in the closing stages of the third stage after being involved in a multi-rider incident. Phinney crossed the line in an ambulance, receiving medical attention before making his way onto the rostrum. The incident itself was started by Roberto Ferrari clipping Mark Cavendish – the winner of the second stage – causing Cavendish to fall and the rest of the field to stack up behind. Race organisers saw fit to demote Ferrari on the stage results, penalise him on both time – 30 seconds penalty on the general classification – and a 25-point deduction, while he was fined also. Ferrari was remorseful at the time of the crash, but later apologised to Cavendish and other riders involved.

Upon the race's return to Italy,  won the fourth stage, the team time trial in Verona. Alex Rasmussen had been placed third after the Danish leg, but he was dropped during the stage and thus it was Ramūnas Navardauskas who picked up the maglia rosa from Phinney, becoming the first rider from Lithuania to wear the leader's jersey at the Giro. Navardauskas held on to the jersey for another day, before Adriano Malori assumed the lead of the race at the end of stage six. Malori had been a part of the breakaway on that stage, before Miguel Ángel Rubiano soloed to victory on the day. The jersey changed hands again the following day, as Malori cracked during the seventh stage, with Ryder Hesjedal coming through to become the first Canadian to wear the pink jersey. He held the jersey for three days, before handing it over to Joaquim Rodríguez, who took the jersey with a win on the tenth stage, a steep finish into Assisi. Rodríguez held on to the jersey the next day, topping the overall standings with the more mountainous second half of the Giro still to race.

Stage 1
5 May 2012 — Herning (Denmark), individual time trial (ITT)

The race commenced with a short individual time trial stage, much like it had done on the Giro's previous start in a foreign country – the start in Herning was the tenth time that the race had started outside of Italy, and the furthest north geographically – when the race began with an individual time trial of  held in Amsterdam, Netherlands in 2010. The stage in Herning itself,  in length, was relatively flat, dropping only  in altitude from the start, to the end. Despite this, it was considered technical due to the nature of the parcours, with several tight ninety-degree turns and cobblestones on several sections of the course before the finish at H. P. Hansensvej. Jackson Rodríguez was the first rider to depart the start house in Herning, recording a time of 11' 58" for the course, a time that was eventually only good enough for the bottom ten places overall.

Indeed, Rodríguez's lead was short-lived as Marco Bandiera, 's Jonas Aaen Jørgensen and  rider Bernhard Eisel all assumed the top spot as they reached the finish, with Robert Hunter of  recording the first time under eleven minutes, as he set a time of 10' 54". Hunter's time held to the next group of riders and it was his team-mate Ramūnas Navardauskas that took the lead; Navardauskas recorded a time some six seconds faster, and was good enough to hold off the rest of the field for over two hours. Navardauskas' time was given a few close calls; 's Jesse Sergent went quicker at the start of the stage – four seconds ahead of Navardauskas to the mid-stage intermediate point – but ultimately faded to two seconds outside of the Lithuanian rider's time. A while later, Brett Lancaster went even closer to the time of Navardauskas for the newly renamed  team; he was quicker to the intermediate point than what Sergent had been, but fell outside the time by just one second at the stage finish, having encountered his minute-man Andrey Zeits in the closing stages.

Navardauskas' stay at the head of the stage classification was eventually ended by 's Manuele Boaro, who had placed in the top ten in individual time trials of both Tirreno–Adriatico and the Tour de Romandie, having set the quickest time to the intermediate point and eventually continued the pace to the end of the stage, recording a time of 10' 41". Thomas had held the advantage at midpoint by one second, but an impressive second half of the course turned a deficit into an eventual stage-winning margin of nine seconds. Thus Phinney, who later stated that it had been a dream to win the jersey, became only the third American rider to wear the leader's maglia rosa after Andrew Hampsten in 1988 and Christian Vande Velde in 2008. Phinney and Thomas were safe from further challenges, but Alex Rasmussen and 's Gustav Larsson both broke into the top five later on, recording times of 10' 39" and 10' 48" respectively. Further back, 's Roman Kreuziger recorded the best time of the overall contenders, with a time of 11' 02" good enough for 28th position in the stage results. Ivan Basso and Joaquim Rodríguez set times within ten seconds of Kreuziger in their disadvantageous discipline; although they both gained a 20-second advantage over  pair Damiano Cunego and Michele Scarponi.

Stage 1 result and general classification after stage 1

Stage 2
6 May 2012 — Herning (Denmark) to Herning (Denmark), 

In the breakaway, Balloni guaranteed himself as the recipient of the first maglia azzurra of the race, as he crested the day's only categorised climb in Østerbjerg first, ahead of Rubiano and Kaisen.

The lead advantage at this point – with around  remaining – had been cut to less than half of what it had been before; 's pace on the front allowed the gap to fall to just over five minutes on the route. Parity however was short-lived as an attacking move was launched by Kaisen's team-mate Lars Bak, the Danish rider giving home fans someone to cheer for; he was given space for a time by the main field, allowing to get clear by around 45 seconds as they reached the  remaining mark.

The lap had been passing without drama, until race leader Taylor Phinney crashed a third of the way around the lap. Once he got back onto his feet, Phinney suffered the misfortune of dropping his chain and lost over 30 seconds trying to fix the issue, but with help from his team-mates, including Danilo Wyss and Alessandro Ballan, he managed to bridge back up to the main pack ahead of the finish. At the front,  were starting to set up their leadout train for Tyler Farrar while  had hoped to get Andrea Guardini, the six-stage winner at the Tour de Langkawi earlier in the season, in position for the sprint. As the field rounded the final corner, 's Theo Bos lost control – having clipped the wheel of team-mate Mark Renshaw – and crashed into Alexander Kristoff, and caused a stack-up which reduced the number of contenders for the stage win; 's train was still in position at the front, but Geraint Thomas delivered Mark Cavendish to the line for the incumbent world champion to claim his 31st Grand Tour stage win on the line, ahead of Goss and 's Geoffrey Soupe. Phinney held the leader's jersey after finishing within the main field, while Cavendish took the lead of the points classification from Phinney.

Stage 3
7 May 2012 — Horsens (Denmark) to Horsens (Denmark), 

The third stage of the race was dedicated to Belgian rider Wouter Weylandt – the winner of the third stage of the 2010 edition of the race into Middelburg, Netherlands – after he crashed while descending the Passo del Bocco during the third stage of the 2011 race, and died of his injuries in the crash. A short ceremony, including a minute's silence led by  team members – Weylandt's former  team – was held prior to the stage in Horsens. As well as Weylandt, the mayor of Horsens, Jan Trøjborg, was also commemorated during the ceremony. Trøjborg, who had been a prevalent figure in bringing the Giro to Denmark, died on 6 May after suffering a heart attack during an amateur bicycle ride in Jutland.

Six riders made up the stage's breakaway, including sixth-placed Ramūnas Navardauskas, but they could not gather more than three-and-a-half minutes of an advantage throughout the entire parcours, and were all caught by around  remaining. Cavendish picked up the wheel of 's Tyler Farrar and they attacked down the outside of the road, moving forward at around  remaining.

 rider Roberto Ferrari tried to move from the left side of the road to the right side of it, but as he aggressively switched lanes, he clipped Cavendish, sending the world champion to the ground and causing the whole field to stack up behind. Among other riders to fall were overall leader Taylor Phinney and  sprinter Sacha Modolo. In front of the chaos, Goss led out the sprint to take 's first Grand Tour win, and with the bonus seconds on offer at the finish, moved into the top ten overall, as well as taking the points classification lead from Cavendish;  rider Juan José Haedo finished second ahead of Farrar. Ferrari, who had finished the stage ninth, was demoted to the end of the stage results, fined, and was penalised 30 seconds in the general classification and 25 points in the points classification; a decision that his team boss Gianni Savio had no qualms about, although Ferrari was remorseless when reflecting about his actions. Cavendish later tweeted that Ferrari should be "ashamed to take out Pink, Red & World Champ jerseys", and also questioned the decision to keep Ferrari in the race.

Stage 4
9 May 2012 — Verona, team time trial (TTT)

For the seventh successive year, the Giro's first stage on Italian soil was held as a time trial; on this occasion it was held in and around Verona, on a  circuit. The circuit started at the Basilica di San Zeno, heading out towards the comune of San Pietro in Cariano, around  outside of Verona before returning to Verona itself, finishing on the city's largest piazza, the Piazza Bra. Thus, who were bottom of the classification, trailing  by two minutes and eighteen seconds, were the first team to set off on the stage.  set a time of 38' 49" for the course, with only  – starting three minutes later – recording a slower time overall.

The team's time held until the second team from the end,  went round the course five seconds quicker, for their second team time trial win of the year after a victory in the Tour of Qatar; the result, and the squad's teamwork, pleased sporting director Allan Peiper at the conclusion of the stage. Phinney later suggested that his crashes of previous days may have been a contributing factor in the loss of the leader's jersey.

Stage 5
10 May 2012 — Modena to Fano, 

Following the route of the Via Aemilia Roman road, Pierpaolo De Negri of  instigated the breakaway of the day, and was joined shortly after by several other riders, with  pairing Olivier Kaisen – who had been a part of the second stage breakaway – and Brian Bulgaç, and  rider Alessandro De Marchi joining De Negri out front. The quartet quickly stepped up the pace to pull clear of the peloton, fronted by the  team of race leader Ramūnas Navardauskas. After leaving Forlì, approaching the midpoint of the stage, the breakaway's lead was over six minutes.  then set about reducing their advantage steadily, with proficient time-trial riders Alex Rasmussen and Sébastien Rosseler controlling the tempo on the front of the main field as they headed ever nearer the finish point;  also had riders towards the front, in the hope of setting up their sprinter Arnaud Démare for the finish in Fano.  then drove the pace of the peloton – reducing their advantage to 2' 30" – as the leaders hit the foot of the day's only categorised climb, the fourth-category Gabicce Monte where De Negri led across the summit, and Kaisen was dropped on the climb. The main field had reduced their advantage to half of what it was at the bottom of the climb.

Within that distance, there were several mini-attacks by the likes of former Italian national champion Giovanni Visconti and another  rider, Adam Hansen, but it all came down to the final sprint for the line. With a split in the peloton – resulting in a five-second gap – Hunter missed out on the maglia rosa by five seconds, and the jersey remained with Navardauskas. Goss and Cavendish – who was joined on the podium by his new-born daughter Delilah Grace – both moved into the top five overall with the bonus seconds on offer at the finish.

Stage 6
11 May 2012 — Urbino to Porto Sant'Elpidio, 

After only fourth-category climbs at best during the early stages of the race, the sixth stage saw the introduction of the higher categorised climbs, with three third-category climbs on the stage's parcours, as well as the second-category Passo della Cappella on gravel roads, all coming after the  mark. Fifteen riders representing fourteen teams – only  had more than one rider in the breakaway, with riders Gatis Smukulis and Aleksandr Kuschynski – contributed to the opening move of the stage, as they accelerated off the front of the main field inside the first  of the stage. Of the fifteen, four riders were dropped very quickly after that, including mountains classification leader Alfredo Balloni, with the best placed of the remaining eleven out front being 's Luke Roberts, who had been 25th prior to the stage. , who did not have a rider in the move out front, set about trying to bring the gap down to the main field, as the eleven riders held an advantage of close to nine minutes prior to the first climb of the day, the Cingoli.

's Michał Gołaś led over the climb, while Miguel Ángel Rubiano attacked on all three of the remaining climbs, giving him enough points to replace Balloni as the leader of the mountains classification at stage's end. After sitting up on the first two climbs to allow his breakaway companions – sans one rider, 's Pablo Lastras, who abandoned after a crash with  rider Jack Bauer – to rejoin, Rubiano did not wait at the top of the Montegranaro and accelerated away solo. Rubiano continued to extend his gap over the main field in the next few kilometres, extending his gap over his former breakaway companions to a maximum of a minute-and-a-half, while he had three minutes in hand over the peloton. As it transpired, Rubiano continued on to the stage victory, 70 seconds clear of a group of riders consisting of 's Adriano Malori, Gołaś, Alexsandr Dyachenko of the  team, and Cesare Benedetti representing Grand Tour debutants . The field was led over the line 41 seconds later by  rider Daryl Impey, but Malori gained sufficient time to become the new leader of the race overall, 15 seconds ahead of Gołaś. Rubiano moved into fourth place in the standings behind Ryder Hesjedal, half a minute behind Malori.

Stage 7
12 May 2012 — Recanati to Rocca di Cambio, 

Although there was only one other climb on the parcours – the Colle Galluccio – the stage was considered hilly, as the majority of the stage consisted of frequent hills and descents, and was run above  except for the opening . The primary breakaway of the stage was formed early in the stage, when a wave of four riders went clear.

Pirazzi caught up to Rabottini, while 's José Herrada and Daniele Pietropolli caught up to Agnoli, with Herrada later joining the front duo and 's Ivan Santaromita established an all-Italian chase group with Agnoli and Pietropolli. Several  riders attacked on the climb, which in effect brought the main field up towards the leaders, with Rabottini being absorbed back after failing to hold on to the pace set by Herrada and Pirazzi.

Pirazzi tried to attack Herrada on several occasions within the final  of the stage, but he could not establish a big enough gap to get clear. With Scarponi's team-mate Adriano Malori dropping off the back of the peloton at the foot of the climb, Ryder Hesjedal – fifth on the stage, five seconds behind Tiralongo – assumed the lead of the race, to become the first Canadian rider to wear the leader's pink jersey. Fifteen seconds behind, Tiralongo moved into second place ahead of 's Joaquim Rodríguez.

Stage 8
13 May 2012 — Sulmona to Lago Laceno, 

For the third successive day, the riders contended with a stage that was designated as a medium-mountain stage, with the race reaching its most southerly point by the finish in Laceno. Again, only two categorised climbs were scheduled; the fourth-category Valico di Macerone climb was contested at the  mark, before descending down and ramping up towards the finish, with the day's other climb – the Colle Molella – coming just  prior to the finish. By the midpoint of the stage, the lead quartet held a lead of over eleven minutes after the peloton elected not to chase them down at first.

With ,  and  driving the pace on the front of the peloton, the advantage that Amador and Marczyński was reduced steadily, and they were caught with  remaining. At  to go, Giro del Trentino winner Domenico Pozzovivo attacked, and quickly gained a 30-second gap before any movement was made in the peloton, when Beñat Intxausti attempted to follow him; he could not catch him, as Pozzovivo held on to win his first Giro stage by 23 seconds. Ryder Hesjedal maintained the maglia rosa, with Rodríguez moving ahead of Paolo Tiralongo into second place – nine seconds behind Hesjedal – while Intxausti and Pozzovivo moved into fifth and thirteenth in the overall classification respectively.

Stage 9
14 May 2012 — San Giorgio del Sannio to Frosinone, 

With no categorised climbs on the parcours, the stage – although undulating – was widely expected to be a battle between the sprinters in Frosinone, with the top two riders in the points classification, 's Mark Cavendish and 's Matthew Goss widely tipped for stage honours, with Mark Renshaw also looking to usurp his former  team-mates for a first World Tour win.  rider Brian Bulgaç made it into the breakaway for the second time in five stages, and was joined at the head of the race by Martijn Keizer of the  team, and 's Pierre Cazaux. The breakaway trio's maximum advantage over the main field came around an hour into the stage, with the gap breaching the four-minute mark, but with none of the three riders in any contention to challenge overall leader Ryder Hesjedal, the teams of the general classification contenders allowed them to hang off the front. With  on the front of the peloton, the advantage started to dwindle and with  remaining in the stage, their lead was under a minute. Keizer left his two rivals behind and began a solo escape in the hope of staying clear of the peloton all the way to Frosinone.

With help from team-mate Ángel Vicioso, Rodríguez tried to break clear but was promptly recaptured by the main field. Contact between Goss and 's Filippo Pozzato sent both riders to the tarmac, with other riders, including Cavendish, being forced down as well. Pozzato blamed Goss for the crash, while  sporting director Matt White directed the blame at Pozzato. With a reduced number of sprinters for the finish,  rider Giacomo Nizzolo was best placed for the sprint, but a quick-closing Francisco Ventoso of the  wrested the stage win away from Nizzolo, his second career Giro stage victory. Ventoso was followed over the line by 's Fabio Felline, Nizzolo and 's Damiano Caruso, the young rider classification leader. Hesjedal was also in the top ten of the stage results, and maintained his overall lead, having covered off Rodríguez's late-stage attack.

Stage 10
15 May 2012 — Civitavecchia to Assisi, 

Although race organisers characterised the stage as "medium-mountain", only one climb was categorised on the parcours, with that being the hilltop finish in Assisi. The climb was in two parts, peaking at 15% in places on the first ascent, and after a slight descent, an average gradient of 8.5% for the final  with elements of the climb being held on pavé. 's Joaquim Rodríguez – second place overnight, nine seconds behind leader Ryder Hesjedal – was the favourite for the stage, having won numerous races on similarly steep finishes in the previous twelve months, including two stage victories at the 2011 Vuelta a España and a win at April's La Flèche Wallonne.

After several, yet unsuccessful, mini-attacks in the opening few kilometres of the stage, a breakaway move of riders was established; consisting of  rider Martijn Keizer – for the second day running – with 's Miguel Mínguez also making it out front for the second time during the race. The group managed to extend their advantage to a maximum of almost five minutes after ; with Bonnafond being best placed of the five riders in the overall classification, trailing Hesjedal by almost 24 minutes,  and  protected their respective highest-placed riders by staying towards the front of the peloton.

With added assistance from Clement, the trio later rejoined Bonnafond, Mínguez and Failli at the head of the race, and held a lead over the peloton, led by Hesjedal's  squad, of around a minute; their strong pace at the front managed to bring the gap down to about twenty seconds with  remaining. The leaders were caught  later, with several teams moving forward to be in a prime position for the climb up to Assisi. Tomas Vaitkus and Tom-Jelte Slagter tried to go clear on the lower stages of the climb, but it was not until 's John Gadret and  rider Rigoberto Urán hit the front that the main group of riders started to accelerate. Slagter then tried to go clear once again, with only Rodríguez and 's Bartosz Huzarski following closely; Rodríguez left his sprint until  to go, but was sufficient to take the stage victory – his first Giro win, meaning that he had won a stage in all three Grand Tours – and with bonus seconds on the line, the leader's pink jersey for the first time in his career. Huzarski was second, with Slagter fading to seventh behind Hesjedal.

Stage 11
16 May 2012 — Assisi to Montecatini Terme, 

The peloton was keeping the gap in check however, despite Denifl – the best-placed of the sextet – trailing overnight leader Joaquim Rodríguez by almost 42 minutes.

With ,  and  doing the majority of the work on the front of the peloton, the gap that the breakaway held fluctuated between two and four minutes; at the summit of the stage's first of two climbs, the Poggio alla Croce after , the gap that the breakaway – now minus Ponzi, who had fallen back to the peloton after the first hour's racing – held was just two minutes. At this point, Boaro – a proficient time trial rider, having been national champion as a junior, and finished runner-up to Adriano Malori in the 2011 Italian championships – attacked his breakaway companions. Boaro managed to hold out off the front until the final finishing circuit,  in length, with the  leading the way.

A mini-attack occurred on the climb at Vico, but it was pulled back quickly after; in effect, guaranteeing a bunch sprint.  tried to set up the finish for Mark Cavendish, but a miscue on the final corner by leadout men Peter Kennaugh and Geraint Thomas hampered the world champion, allowing Tomas Vaitkus and 's Roberto Ferrari to get through and contest the finish. Behind that, 's sprinter Sacha Modolo hit the tarmac for the second time during the race, having been involved in the stage 3 incident. Ferrari finished stronger, and beat out his chasers for his first Giro win, with  rider Francesco Chicchi outdragging Vaitkus for second. Cavendish finished an unhappy fourth, but did take the points classification lead from Vaitkus' team-mate Matthew Goss. There were no other changes to the jersey holders, with Rodríguez holding the overall lead into the second half of the race.

For further results, see 2012 Giro d'Italia, Stage 12 to Stage 21

Notes

References

2012 Giro d'Italia
Giro d'Italia stages